Beeralingeswara' Birappa, a form of the Hindu god Shiva, is the main deity worshiped by the Kuruba community people.

The beeralingwara swamy temple we can see more in south India (Especially more in Karnataka). The main temple will be in Talikatte, which is located in Chitradurga district, Karnataka. Beeralingeshwara swamy is also in Sanenahalli, Hassan which is worshipped by many people

Forms of Shiva